Artemisia tripartita is a species of flowering plant in the aster family known by the common name threetip sagebrush. It is native to western North America from British Columbia to Nevada and Montana to Colorado. It covers about 8.4 million acres (3.4 million hectares) of the Rocky Mountains and Great Basin.

Ecology
This plant is common and can be dominant in some regions, including the steppe of Washington, the sagebrush of southern Idaho, and the grassland and shrubland in western Montana. It grows on steep slopes and rocky, shallow soils. It tolerates dry soils well.

Description
This plant is an evergreen shrub up to 2 meters tall. The subspecies rupicola (Wyoming threetip sagebrush) is a dwarf subspecies with decumbent branches, spreading to about half a meter but growing only about 15 centimeters tall. The leaves are three-parted. The plant produces many seeds. It can also spread by sprouting from shallow roots and by layering. The plant is aromatic.

Subspecies
 Artemisia tripartita subsp. rupicola Beetle - Wyoming, Colorado
 Artemisia tripartita subsp. tripartita - British Columbia, Washington, Oregon, Idaho, Montana, Wyoming, Utah, Nevada

References

External links
 The Nature Conservancy
 

tripartita
Plants described in 1841
Flora of North America